Just Jordan is an American television sitcom that aired on Nickelodeon as a part of the network's TEENick lineup. The series debuted on January 7, 2007, and was canceled on August 23, 2008, with 29 episodes produced.

Since the series' cancellation, Nickelodeon and The N continued to air reruns until December 26, 2008. BET also aired reruns of the series until 2009. After several years, reruns made a short-lived return on MTV2, with only 6 episodes airing on October 16, 2016.

Premise
The show follows the exploits and actions of Jordan Lewis, who has moved to Los Angeles from Little Rock. He has to work in his gruff grandfather's diner, and survive with a silly younger sister, a critical cousin, and his over-protective mom who seems to know all his misdeeds before he even conceives of them.

Production
The first season of Just Jordan had 13 episodes, and ran from January 7, 2007, to August 10, 2007. The second season, which was filmed in front of a live studio audience, began September 16, 2007 and ended on March 2, 2008, with the two-part episode "Picture Me Rollin'". The third season saw only three episodes produced, which were later added to season two. Production of the series was halted due to the 2007–08 writer's strike, with Nickelodeon making the decision to cancel the series after season two. In all, the second season had a total of 16 episodes.

Characters
 Jordan James Lewis  (played by Lil' JJ) is 16-years-old and the main character of the series. Jordan usually speaks his mind before thinking about it. His parents are divorced, and he moved with his mother and sister from Arkansas to Los Angeles to live with their grandfather. His best friends are Joaquin Montez and Tony Lee. He enjoys basketball, and works at his grandfather's grill. In the first season, he went out with Tamika, but they broke up by the second season. Jordan's new love interest is Autumn Williams.
 Joaquin Osmando Montez (played by Eddy Martin) is the best friend of Jordan Lewis. He is planning a career in politics (just like the rest of his family other than his dad who is a police officer) and does not like to make mistakes because they might end up on his "permanent record". He is counting on Jordan and his other friends to make him more "social".
 Tony Lee (played by Justin Chon) is Jordan's other best friend, and sometimes rival. They began as rivals on the basketball court, but when Tony took a job at Grandpa's restaurant Jordan and Tony became best friends. Tony and Jordan are constantly competing for girls, especially Autumn, Jordan's new interest.
 Tangie Cunningham (played by Raven Goodwin) is Jordan and Monica's cousin and his toughest critic. She is concerned that Jordan's image will have in cool in the big city of L.A. Tangie is obsessed with Tony and one of her main goals is to pass Oprah Winfrey in fame and in wealth. She has a crush on Tony as seen in all of the episodes so far.
 Monica Lewis (played by Kristen Combs) is Jordan's 9-year-old sister who has him tracked down 24/7. Jordan doesn't mind his sister and always wants to know what she is doing and how he can help. When Jordan began ignoring her in the episode "Air Jordan" she asked Tony to take her to school. She has two dolls that look like her called "Ponica" and "Shonica". She loves to watch her TV, and eating chips. Her nickname is Mo-Mo.
 Pamela Cunningham-Lewis (played by Shania Accius) is Jordan and Monica's mother who according to him: "has eyes in the back of her head" She moved her family back to Los Angeles and they are back living in Grandpa's house/restaurant. She is very over-protective of Jordan.
 Grant Cunningham (played by Beau Billingslea) is Jordan's, Tangie's, and Monica's grandfather and Pamela's father. He has owned the local diner for as long as anyone can remember. He expects discipline and order from everyone (especially Tangie and Jordan). Most people think he can make the best macaroni and cheese in L.A. County. He often falls for Monica and will buy anything for her.
 Tamika Newsome (played by Chelsea Harris) (season 1) was Tangie's best friend and a girl that Jordan has a major crush on. She developed a crush on Jordan because he was acting like a thug, but then she realized that she really didn't like bad boys. She went out with Jordan for a while, then broke up with him. Tamika was a nice girl, but she wasn't as interested in Jordan as Jordan was interested in her. She doesn't return in the second season because she moved away.
 Autumn Williams (played by Chelsea Tavares) (season 2) Is the new girl in town, Autumn just moved to the neighborhood with her family. She's gorgeous, sweet and down to earth. No one would ever guess that she's the super model next door. Jordan and Autumn love hanging out together and become fast friends. Over time, their friendship blossoms into a relationship between the two.

Episodes

Season 1 (2007)

Season 2 (2007–08)

References

External links
 

2000s American black sitcoms
2000s American teen sitcoms
2007 American television series debuts
2008 American television series endings
2000s Nickelodeon original programming
English-language television shows
Television series about families
Television series about teenagers
Television shows set in Los Angeles